Sillod Assembly constituency is one of the 288 Vidhan Sabha (legislative assembly) constituencies of Maharashtra state in western India.

Overview
Sillod is part of the Jalna Lok Sabha constituency along with five other Vidhan Sabha segments, namely Badnapur, Jalna and Bhokardan in Jalna district and Phulambri and Paithan in the Aurangabad district.

Members of Legislative Assembly

Election results

Assembly elections 2004

Assembly elections 2009

Assembly elections 2014

References

Assembly constituencies of Maharashtra
Aurangabad district, Maharashtra
Year of establishment missing